The Namibia Civil Aviation Authority (NCAA), previously the Directorate of Civil Aviation (DCA), is the civil aviation authority of Namibia. It is a regulatory body of the Ministry of Works and Transport. The head office of the agency is located in Windhoek.

It was previously in charge of aircraft accident and incident investigation in Namibia. In November 2013 accident and incident investigation were separated from the DCA in the Directorate of Aircraft Accident Investigations (DAAI) to ensure that investigations are unbiased. Namibia's chief accident investigator now reports directly to the minister of Works, Transport and Communication.

The cabinet of Namibia had approved the establishment of the NCAA in 2003. On 1 November 2016, per the Civil Aviation Act, the authority was established, and the Directorate of Civil Aviation was dissolved. As of 2021 Ericsson Nengola has been acting as the executive director of the NCAA.

References

External links

 Official website

Organizations investigating aviation accidents and incidents
Aviation organisations based in Namibia
Government of Namibia
Namibia
Civil aviation in Namibia
2016 establishments in Namibia